Melissa Anne "Missy" Marlowe (born August 25, 1971) is an American retired gymnast. She competed in six events at the 1988 Summer Olympics.

Marlowe, who grew up in Salt Lake City, competed for the University of Utah gymnastics team and was a five-time NCAA champion. She won the Honda Sports Award as the nation's top female gymnast, and the first ever Honda-Broderick Cup awarded to a gymnast as the nation's top female athlete in 1992 and in 2018 was inducted into the Pac-12 Hall of Honors.

Her daughter Milan Clausi competed for the University of California, Berkeley gymnastics team.

References

External links
 

1971 births
Living people
American female artistic gymnasts
Olympic gymnasts of the United States
Gymnasts at the 1988 Summer Olympics
Sportspeople from Hainaut (province)
Pan American Games medalists in gymnastics
Pan American Games gold medalists for the United States
Gymnasts at the 1987 Pan American Games
Utah Red Rocks gymnasts
NCAA gymnasts who have scored a perfect 10